Chignall is a civil parish in the City of Chelmsford in Essex, England. The civil parish has 311 inhabitants (2011). The villages were recorded in the Domesday Book in 1086 as Cingehala. The parish was created in 1888 from the parishes of Chignal St James and Chignall Smealy.

References

Civil parishes in Essex
City of Chelmsford